Osseo is an iron meteorite found in 1931 by Mr. Frank Johnston about  from Osseo, Ontario. No fireball was observed and there was no evidence that it was a recent fall.

Classification
It is a coarse octahedrite, IAB complex.

Fragments
The main mass is in the Smithsonian Institution, Washington.

See also
 Glossary of meteoritics

References

External links
Encyclopedia of Meteorites: Osseo

Meteorites found in Canada
1931 in Canada
1931 in Ontario
Geology of Ontario